The Liberty Corporation was a media corporation originally based in Greenville, South Carolina. At its peak, Liberty owned 15 network-affiliated television stations across the Midwest and Southern regions of the United States. Cable advertising sales group CableVantage Inc., video production facility Take Ten Productions and broadcast equipment distributor Broadcast Merchandising Corporation were also some of its assets.

Liberty was founded in 1919 when W. Frank Hipp, a former top agent at Spartanburg-based Southeastern Life Insurance Company, struck out on his own. Within a decade, Liberty had grown large enough to buy his former employer.  It entered broadcasting in 1930, when it bought WIS in Columbia—the start of what would become the Broadcasting Company of the South, renamed Cosmos Broadcasting in 1965.  Under Francis Hipp, who succeeded his father in 1943, Liberty reorganized as a holding company, The Liberty Corporation, in 1967.

Liberty sold its insurance subsidiaries, Liberty Life and Pierce National Life, to Royal Bank of Canada in 2000.  Cosmos was then folded directly into the Liberty banner.

After the sale of its insurance division, the company employed approximately 1,400 people. The executive officers included chairman and CEO W. Hayne Hipp (who, with his family, owned about 25% of the company before its sale to Raycom Media), president and COO James M. Keelor, CFO Howard L. Schrott.

On August 25, 2005, Liberty agreed to be bought out by Raycom Media. Raycom paid $987 million, or $47.35 per Liberty share, and assumed Liberty's debts of approximately $110 million in the buyout. The acquisition was completed on January 31, 2006. After closing the deal, Raycom sold a number of stations, including two from the Liberty portfolio.  They included ABC affiliate WWAY-TV in Wilmington, North Carolina to Morris Multimedia and CBS affiliate KGBT-TV in Harlingen, Texas to Barrington Broadcasting.

Former Liberty stations
 (**) – Indicates that it was built and signed on by Liberty.
(++) – Indicates a station that was owned by Orion Broadcasting prior to its merger with Cosmos/Liberty in 1981.

Note:
1 Raycom acquired WMBF's construction permit from Liberty, prior to the station's sign-on in 2008.

References

Companies based in South Carolina
Companies based in Greenville, South Carolina
Defunct companies based in South Carolina
Defunct broadcasting companies of the United States
Mass media companies disestablished in 2006
2006 mergers and acquisitions
Gray Television
Mass media companies established in 1919
1919 establishments in South Carolina
2006 disestablishments in South Carolina